Shelat is a surname. Only belongs to the Gujarati Bajkhedawal Brahmin caste. The total population with the surname is roughly 2000–3000 in the world. They all belong to the Village called Umreth in Kheda district. Notable people with the surname include:

Ajit Shelat, Indian technology entrepreneur
Himanshi Shelat (born 1947), Indian author
Jaishanker Manilal Shelat (1908–1985), Indian Supreme Court judge
Kirit Shelat (born 1946), Indian public administrator (IAS)
S K Shelat, Indian public administrator (IAS)
Sureshbhai N Shelat, Indian lawyer and former Advocate General, Government of Gujarat
Rahul Shelat, Indian Engineer (GOOGLE)
Rujuta Shelat, Opthalmologist (Surat, Gujarat)